Tafsir Ayyashi is an Imami Shia exegesis of the Quran, written by Mohammad ibn Masoud Ayyashi also known as al-ʿAyyashi (الـعـيـّاشـي d. 320 AH / 932 CE).

The surviving text covers only up to the end of sura 18, 'The Cave'; more material is quoted by later Imami scholars, for instance Tabrisi. As of the 18th century, al-Majlisi and Al-Hurr al-Aamili were not aware of the complete text of Ayyashi's work.

Similar to Tafsir Furat Kufi and Tafsir Qomi, this work is a collection of commentaries upon selected verses, not a unified commentary of the entire text. Many of its single-verse commentaries also exist, independently of ʿAyyashi, in al-Kulayni's al-kafi and al-Hakim al-Hasakani's Shawahid al-tanzil. Many of these hadiths were taken from al-Sayyari's Kitab al-Qiraat; others, from the lost tafasir of Jabir ibn Yazid al-Juʿfi and Abu'l-Jarud Ziyad ibn al-Mundhir (technically a Zaydi, founder of the Jarudiyya). Correlation with the Shawahid hints at Sunni material as well.

ʿAyyashi avoids inclusion of his own point of view explicitly, but instead quotes related hadiths from the Imams and the past Shia scholars. This commentary can be considered as the representative of Shia literature in the pre-Buyids era, when Shiite commentators "did not feel entitled to emit opinions or judgement of their own without support from hadiths going back to the Imams or other recognized Shia scholars".

ʿAyyashi accepted hadiths that held that there had been alteration (tahrif) in the ʿUthmanic mushaf of the Qur'an. He also was interested in apocalyptic material, which he brought to Q. 2:148, 155 (but not 243); 3:83; 6:158 (not 65); 8:39; 9:33; 11:8; 16:1; 17:4–8. The focus of his work however was in jurisprudence, the ayat al-ahkam.

References

Shia tafsir